Brad Abraham is a Canadian-born screenwriter, author, journalist, producer, and comic book creator. His past film and television work include Stonehenge Apocalypse, Robocop: Prime Directives, I Love Mummy, Fresh Meat, and the National Film Board of Canada-produced Hoverboy. He was also an uncredited writer on the remake of the 1970s slasher classic Black Christmas. He is also the creator and writer of Space Goat Productions acclaimed comic book series Mixtape, and author of the novel Magicians Impossible (2017).

Filmography

References

External links
BradAbraham.com

Rue Morgue Magazine

Canadian male screenwriters
21st-century Canadian screenwriters
Canadian television writers
Canadian emigrants to the United States
Living people
Canadian male television writers
Writers from Ottawa
Year of birth missing (living people)